Jakob Friedrich Ludovici (1671, Wacholzhagen near Treptow – 1723, Gießen) was a German jurist.

Ludovici studied law in Stargard, Königsberg and Halle. Appointed a professor extraordinary in 1701, he became a full professor in 1711. In 1721 he was appointed privy councillor, vice chancellor and Professor Juris primarius at the University of Gießen.

Works
Untersuchung des Indifferentismi Religionum, 1700
Delineatio historiae juris divini, naturalis et positivi universalis, 1701
Einleitung zum Lehns-Proceß, 1718 (E-Copy)

References

External links

1671 births
1723 deaths
Jurists from Berlin